Semibankirschina, or seven bankers, was a group of seven powerful Russian business oligarchs who played an important role in the political and economical life of Russia between 1996 and 2000. In spite of internal conflicts, the group worked together in order to re-elect President Boris Yeltsin in 1996, and thereafter to successfully manipulate him and his political environment from behind the scenes.

The seven businessmen were identified by oligarch Boris Berezovsky in an October 1996 interview, and the term "semibankirschina" was then coined by a journalist in November 1996 as a takeoff on the Seven Boyars (semiboyarschina), who deposed Tsar Vasily Shuisky in 1610 during Time of Troubles.

The seven bankers
Russian oligarch Boris Berezovsky, in a 29 October 1996 interview in the Financial Times, named seven Russian bankers and businessmen that he claimed controlled most of the economy and media in Russia and had helped bankroll Boris Yeltsin’s re-election campaign in 1996.

The word "Semibankirschina" was subsequently coined by the Russian journalist Andrey Fadin of the Obschaya Gazeta newspaper, in a 14 November 1996 article titled "Semibankirschina as a New Russian Variation of Semiboyarschina". He wrote that "they control the access to budget money and basically all investment opportunities inside the country. They own the gigantic information resource of the major TV channels. They form the President's opinion. Those who didn't want to walk along them were either strangled or left the circle." Slightly over a year later, Fadin was killed in a car accident. Aleksandr Solzhenitsyn also used this word in his critical 1998 essay Russia under Avalanche to describe the current political regime and to warn people of what he considered an organized crime syndicate that controlled the President and 70% of all Russian money.

The identities of seven bankers are:

Boris Berezovsky – United Bank, Sibneft, ORT
Mikhail Khodorkovsky – Bank Menatep, Yukos
Mikhail Fridman – Alfa Group
Vladimir Vinogradov - Inkombank
Vladimir Gusinsky – Most Group, NTV
Vladimir Potanin – UNEXIM Bank
Alexander Smolensky – Bank Stolichny

Other sources, including collective photo and video materials, suggested that Vitaly Malkin (Rossiysky Kredit) was part of this group too.  From then on, various sources featured different combinations of those eight names to describe the phenomenon of Semibankirschina.

History
It is generally considered that the group was created in March 1996 when the political consultant Sergey Kurginyan invited a group of thirteen Russian oligarchs to sign the so-called Letter of Thirteen (alternatively named Come Out of the Dead End!) in an attempt to cancel the Presidential election of 1996. The manifest was published in Nezavisimaya Gazeta and suggested that two major candidates — Boris Yeltsin and the Communist leader Gennady Zyuganov — should strike a "political compromise" in order to prevent "the economical collapse." It contained eight tips that described the position of business elites. The letter was called "a provocation" by the Communists and thus ignored.

After the plan failed, half of those oligarchs formed what became known as Semibankirschina — a group of seven business moguls ironically named after the 17th century seven boyars who owned the majority of Russian media resources and who decided to promote Boris Yeltsin every way possible. Since Yeltsin was highly unpopular by that time, with only 3—8% support, a complex technology of crowd manipulation was developed by the Gleb Pavlovsky's and Marat Gelman's think tank Foundation for Effective Politics, with the involvement of American specialists (the latter fact was used as a basis for the comedy film Spinning Boris released in 2003).

Known as an extremely "dirty" election campaign both inside and outside of Russia, it was discussed in detail in Gleb Pavlovsky's report President in 1996: Scenarios and Technologies of the Victory published shortly after. As Nezavisimaya Gazeta summarized it, "the formula of victory: attracting the expert resources + dominating in the information field + blocking the competitor's moves + dominating in mass media + dominating in elites." The main analyst of the NTV TV channel Vsevolod Vilchek also admitted that they actively applied technologies of mass manipulation. Both Dmitry Medvedev and Mikhail Gorbachev have since claimed that Yeltsin's victory was hoaxed.

Following the election, the seven bankers became the main power behind Russian politics and economy. Between 1996 and 2000 they gained control over the most valuable state enterprises in the natural resource and metal sectors and unofficially manipulated Yeltsin and his decisions. According to Boris Berezovsky, they acted through Anatoly Chubais — an architect of privatization in Russia and Yeltsin's right-hand man who granted access to him at any time.

All this resulted in further impoverishment of the population, criminalization of businesses and the infamous 1998 Russian financial crisis. This was also the time when the word oligarch grew in popularity, substituting the New Russian nouveau riche term (both with extremely negative subtext). The 1999 saw the sudden rise to power of the unknown FSB officer Vladimir Putin. Boris Berezovsky and his associates claimed that it was him who single-handedly promoted Putin and insisted on his candidature as a Prime-minister and a President.

Yet the following years saw a quick demise of most of the seven bankers and the rise of the new generation of "manageable" Russian oligarchy. Khodorkovsky, Berezovsky and Gusinsky turned into personae non gratae in Russia.  Khodorkovsky lost his business as well as freedom in 2003, while Berezovsky and Gusinsky left Russia in 2000. Smolensky still owns significant companies, but lost his political influence. Vinogradov died in 2008. On 23 March 2013, Berezovsky was found dead at his home, Titness Park, at Sunninghill, near Ascot in Berkshire.

See also
Russian oligarch
Boris Yeltsin 1996 presidential campaign
Loans for shares scheme

References

External links
 Russia bows to the `rule of the seven bankers' at The Irish Times, August 29, 1998
 Thayer Watkins. The Russian Oligarchs of the 1990s at the San Jose State University website
 Seven oligarchs who decided the fate of Russia at the Snob Magazine, January 21, 2011 (in Russian)

Russian oligarchs
Economic history of Russia
Boris Yeltsin 1996 presidential campaign
Boris Berezovsky (businessman)
Mikhail Fridman
Vladimir Gusinsky
Mikhail Khodorkovsky